Midwest Connect was the brand name for the regional airline service of Midwest Airlines, rather than a certificated airline carrier. Skyway Airlines was the sole operator of Midwest Connect since its inception in 1989, until SkyWest Airlines began additional Midwest Connect service on April 1, 2007. SkyWest took over all Midwest Connect operations following Skyway's shutdown of operations on April 5, 2008. In October, 2008, Republic Airlines also began operating for Midwest Connect. On November 3, 2009 the Embraer 170 and Embraer 190 operated by Republic Airlines were rebranded as Midwest Airlines operated by Republic Airlines.  Later, during Midwest's merger with Frontier Airlines under the ownership of Republic, Chautauqua Airlines operated as Midwest Connect.

Destinations 

On January 16, 2008, Midwest Airlines announced that it would transition the operation of all Midwest Connect flights from Skyway Airlines to SkyWest Airlines. Skyway's last day of operations was April 5, 2008. Skyway Airlines continued in an airport services role, providing Ramp and Dining Services operations for Midwest Airlines and Midwest Connect, and Customer Service operations in Midwest Connect field stations.

Fleet 

As of August 2009, the Midwest Connect fleet included 12 aircraft:

All Midwest Connect aircraft feature leather seating, and jet aircraft feature freshly baked cookies on select routes.

Retired Fleet

See also 
 List of defunct airlines of the United States

References

External links

 Midwest Connect Profile

Midwest Airlines
Defunct regional airline brands